Parichay Times is a Hindi daily newspaper established in 2004, published by Parichay Publication in Delhi, India.

Editions

 Delhi (Delhi edition, sub editions of City, Gurgaon, Noida, Faridabad and Ghaziabad)

National newspapers published in India